The 126th district of the Texas House of Representatives contains parts of Harris County. The current Representative is E. Sam Harless, who was first elected in 2018.

References 

126